Mungurrawuy Yunupingu (c.1905–1979) was a prominent Aboriginal Australian artist and leader of the Gumatj clan of the Yolngu people of northeastern Arnhem Land in the Northern Territory of Australia. He was known for his bark paintings.

Biography 
Mungurrawuy Yunupingu was born in northeast Arnhem Land around 1905, of the Yirritja moiety.

He became a senior cultural leader of the Gumatj clan in Yirrkala, in Arnhem Land, and was one of the most significant painters of his time. He was the most prominent Gumatj artist active during the mission days in Arnhem Land.
 
In 1978, H.C. "Nugget" Coombs, the former Governor of the Reserve Bank of Australia, described Mungurrawuy as "an impressive figure – tall, massive, bearded, powerful. He has seven wives and thirty children. These, no doubt, are measures of his status in his community".

Many of these children would go on to have significant careers as artists, musicians and political leaders, most notably his daughters Gulumbu Yunupingu, Gaymala Yunupingu, and Nyapanyapa Yunupingu, and his sons Galarrwuy and Mandawuy Yunupingu, who have both been Australians of the Year.

He died in northeast Arnhem Land in 1979.

Career 

During his career as an artist, Yunupingu drew upon ancestral narratives in his paintings and wood carvings. He is known to be one of the artists who spearheaded the “episodic” manner of painting, where stories are painted in a series of panels to show how they unfold over time. While he painted traditional stories and concepts, his innovation greatly diverged from common single-panelled narrative paintings. His painting style can be described as a well-balanced mix of colours dominated by the use of yellow ochre. The human figures he painted tend to be broad-shouldered and have elongated bodies.

Yunupingu was involved in most of the significant moments in Yolngu art history of the twentieth century. He produced a number of fine crayon drawings for the anthropologist Ronald Berndt after he arrived in Yirrkala in 1946 and in 1948 created a large number of paintings for Charles Mountford and the American-Australian Scientific Expedition to Arnhem Land.

Between 1959 and 1962, Yunupingu produced some of his largest and most significant works for the collector-donor Stuart Scougall, who along with the Art Gallery of New South Wales' assistant director, Tony Tuckson, commissioned a series of monumental bark paintings from the artists of Yirrkala to lay out the major ancestral narratives of the Yolngu clans. Scougall described these works as "the first time such a collection of bark paintings was made in a pictorial ballad sequence whereas other collections have been essentially sporadic, of a piecemeal nature." The majority of these works are now held in the Art Gallery of New South Wales, however a small number of works commissioned by Scougall can be found in other collections around the world, including the Saint Louis Art Museum. Yunupingu also established a strong relationship with the collector and art dealer Jim Davidson.

Aside from ancestral stories, he also produced several paintings depicting the interaction of Yolngu with the Makassan people, who were seafarers that seasonally visited the northern Arnhem Land coast to harvest trepang, or sea cucumbers. It is suspected that Yunupingu was quite young when he last interacted with Makassans, since the Australian Government banned other countries from using the resources found on Australian coasts in 1906. However, he did remember meeting Makassan people and for Berndt’s crayon drawing commission, he drew his famous Port of Macassar.

In the late 1960s, Yunupingu was commissioned to produce a series of painting on masonite board to commemorate events involving the ELDO tracking station at Gurlkurla by Geoff Woods, who was employed as the base manager at a nearby weapons research centre. One work of these works, Space Tracking Station (1967), was subsequently acquired by the South Australian Museum and included in the exhibition Dreamings: The Art of Aboriginal Australia at the Asia Society Galleries in New York City in 1988.  Another work, Man Landing on the Moon (1969), which depicts Neil Armstrong and Buzz Aldrin's Moon landing is held in the Kluge-Ruhe Aboriginal Art Collection of the University of Virginia.

Yirrkala Church Panels (1963) 

On 18 February 1963, the Australian Prime Minister Robert Menzies announced the opening of bauxite mines in the Arnhem Land reserve without consulting Yolngu leaders. Furious at the lack of transparency the Australian Government held for the Yolngu people, clan elders came together to paint the famous Yirrkala Church Panels, which documented the Yolngu claim to the land through ancestral stories. Consisting of two  sheets of masonite, eight elders of the Dhuwa moiety (including Mawalan Marika, Wandjuk Marika and Mithinarri Gurruwiwi) painted one sheet with their major ancestral narratives and clan designs, and eight elders of the Yirritja moiety, including Birrikitji Gumana and Narritjin Maymuru, painted the other sheet with Yirritja designs. This was the first significant political claim to the land by Aboriginal Australians, accompanied by physical documentation in the form of the church panel paintings.

This would  lead to the creation of the Yirrkala Bark Petitions of 1963 (to which Yunupingu was a signatory) and the high court case Milirrpum v Nabalco Pty Ltd (Gove land rights case).

The Yirrkala panels were discarded by the church in 1974, but were salvaged by the Buku-Larrnggay Mulka Centre in 1978. On 27 February 1998 they were unveiled by then prime minister John Howard, and were described by Yolŋu leaders as "Title Deeds which establish the legal tenure for each of our traditional clan estates".

Facsimiles of the panels were commissioned as part of the film set for the feature film Yolngu Boy (2000), and created in 1999 by Yolngu artists Nancy Gaymala Yunupingu, Gulumbu, and Dhuwarrwarr Marika.

Collections 

Art Gallery of New South Wales
Art Gallery of South Australia
Kluge-Ruhe Aboriginal Art Collection of the University of Virginia
National Museum of Australia
Saint Louis Art Museum
Berndt Museum of the University of Western Australia

Significant exhibitions 

 1965: Australian Aboriginal Bark Paintings 1912-1964, Walker Art Gallery, Liverpool, England
 1988: Dreamings: The Art of Aboriginal Australia, Asia Society Galleries, New York City
 1993-4: Aratjara: Art of the First Australians, Europe, 1993-1994: Kunstsammlung Nordrhein-Westfalen, Dusseldorf, Germany; Hayward Gallery, London, England; and the Louisiana Museum of Modern Art, Humlebæk, Denmark
2013-14: Yirrkala Drawings, Art Gallery of New South Wales, Sydney; Berndt Museum of Anthropology, University of Western Australia, Perth; Charles Darwin University Art Gallery, Charles Darwin University, Darwin
2013-2020: Old Masters: Australia's Great Bark Artists, National Museum of Australia, Canberra; National Taiwan Museum, Taipei City; Sichuan Museum, Chengdu; Shenzhen Museum, Shenzhen; Shanghai Natural History Museum, Shanghai; National Museum of China, Beijing

References 

Australian Aboriginal artists
People from the Northern Territory
Australian contemporary artists